The 2020 ACC Men's Basketball Tournament Presented by New York Life was the postseason men's basketball tournament for the Atlantic Coast Conference and was held at the Greensboro Coliseum in Greensboro, North Carolina, from March 10–11, 2020. It was the 67th annual edition of the tournament.

This was the first edition of the tournament to not be available free-to-air at all, as the syndicated ACC package was shut down in favor of the launch of the cable-only ACCN, which exclusively carried the first round of the tournament, with the ESPN networks carrying the remainder of the tournament.

Due to ongoing concerns with the COVID-19 pandemic, officials announced that, initially, the tournament would only be played in front of essential tournament personnel, limited school administrators and student-athlete guests, broadcast television, and credentialed media members present, starting with the quarterfinals; however, shortly before the tipoff of the quarterfinal matchup between Florida State and Clemson, the ACC announced the tournament was canceled and Florida State, the regular season champions, would receive the conference's automatic bid to the NCAA tournament, though that decision became moot with the NCAA Tournament's cancellation later the same day.
Florida state was awarded the conference championship along with the trophy for the 2020 tournament.

Seeds
Fourteen of the 15 ACC teams would have participated in the tournament; the other team, Georgia Tech, was banned from postseason play, including the conference tournament, due to NCAA rules violations. Teams were seeded by record within the conference, with a tiebreaker system to seed teams with identical conference records. The top four seeds received double byes, while seeds 5 through 10 received single byes. Ultimately, the tournament being canceled shortly before the quarterfinal games were to have begun resulted in the top four seeds not playing at all.

Schedule

Bracket

Game summaries

First round

Second round

Quarterfinals

Semifinals

Final

Awards and honors
Tournament MVP:

All-Tournament Teams: not awarded

First Team
 not awarded
 
 
 

Second Team
 not awarded

See also

 2020 ACC women's basketball tournament

References

External links
 2020 ACC Men's Basketball Tournament

Tournament
ACC men's basketball tournament
ACC men's basketball tournament
College sports in North Carolina
Basketball competitions in Greensboro, North Carolina
ACC men's basketball tournament
ACC men's basketball tournament